Carabus lafossei  is a species of beetles of the family Carabidae.

Description
The colours are quite variable, depending on the subspecies. Head and pronotum may be red or bluish, while the elytra may be red, bluish or green, with a strong metallic luster. The surface of elytra has numerous small tubercles. These beautiful ground beetle are active only at night. They primarily feed on slugs, snails and earthworms.

Distribution
This species is native to the southern provinces of China.

Subspecies
 Carabus lafossei buchi Hauser, 1913
 Carabus lafossei coelestis Stewart, 1845
 Carabus lafossei lafossei Feisthamel, 1845
 Carabus lafossei montigradus Hauser, 1920
 Carabus lafossei pseudocoelestis Kleinfeld, 1999
 Carabus lafossei saturatus Hauser, 1913
 Carabus lafossei tiantai Kleinfeld, 1997
 Carabus lafossei tungchengensis Li, 1993

References
 Biolib
 Carabidae of the world

External links
 Carabus lafossei
 Postimage
 Postimage
 Carabus lafossei

lafossei
Beetles described in 1845